Toni Vastić (born 17 January 1993) is an Austrian football forward who plays currently for VfR Aalen. He has previously played for Bayern Munich and Blackburn Rovers.

Club career
In January 2015, after two years with SV Ried, Vastić returned close to his native Vienna and joined Admira Wacker on a free transfer. He signed a contract until 31 May 2016.

Personal life
He is the son of former Austrian international Ivica Vastić. His younger brother Tin plays for Admira Wacker's U14 team.

References

External links

1993 births
Living people
Austrian people of Croatian descent
Austrian footballers
Association football forwards
FC Bayern Munich II players
SV Ried players
FC Admira Wacker Mödling players
FK Austria Wien players
VfR Aalen players
Regionalliga players
Austrian Football Bundesliga players
2. Liga (Austria) players
Austria youth international footballers
Austria under-21 international footballers
Austrian expatriate footballers
Austrian expatriate sportspeople in Germany
Expatriate footballers in Germany
Footballers from Vienna
Expatriate footballers in England
Blackburn Rovers F.C. players
Austrian expatriate sportspeople in England